KELV-LD, virtual channel 27 (UHF digital channel 15), is a low-power UniMás-affiliated television station licensed to Las Vegas, Nevada, United States. Owned by Entravision Communications, it is a sister station to Univision affiliate KINC (channel 15). The two stations share studios on Pilot Road in the unincorporated community of Paradise (with a Las Vegas mailing address); KELV-LD's transmitter is located atop Mount Arden near Henderson.

Subchannel

References

External links

ELV-LD
UniMás network affiliates
Television channels and stations established in 1980
ELV-LD
Low-power television stations in the United States
Entravision Communications stations
1980 establishments in Nevada